Morayfield is an electoral district of the Legislative Assembly in the Australian state of Queensland. It is located in the northern outskirts of Brisbane, south of the Sunshine Coast.

Geography
An outer suburban electorate, Morayfield lies west of the Bruce Highway and south of the Caboolture River. The northern end of the district takes in the suburb of Morayfield and the southern part of Caboolture. At its southern end, the district includes parts of the suburbs of Burpengary and Narangba.

History
A new district created for the 2009 state election, it was constructed mostly from the northern part of the district of Kallangur and the western part of the district of Pumicestone. It also took a section of territory previously belonging to the district of Kurwongbah. Its inaugural member was Mark Ryan of the Labor Party, who was defeated by Darren Grimwade of the Liberal National Party in 2012.

Members for Morayfield

Election results

References

External links
 

Morayfield